Richard Penn Kemble (January 21, 1941 – October 15, 2005), commonly known as "Penn," was an American political activist and a founding member of Social Democrats, USA. He supported  democracy and labor unions in the USA and internationally, and so was active in the civil rights movement, the labor movement, and the social-democratic opposition to communism. He founded organizations including Negotiations Now! and   Frontlash, and he served as director of the Committee for Democracy in Central America. Kemble was appointed to various government boards and institutions throughout the 1990s, eventually becoming the Acting Director of the U.S. Information Agency under President Bill Clinton.

Biography

Early years

Penn Kemble was born in Worcester, Massachusetts in 1941 and grew up in Lancaster, Pennsylvania. He studied at the University of Colorado in the early 1960s, where he helped to organize a local branch of the Young People's Socialist League, the youth section of the Socialist Party of America. While at the University of Colorado, Kemble was influenced by the thinking of Alex Garber, a professor of sociology, who was a social democratic anti-communist.

After moving to New York, Kemble stood out as a neatly dressed, muscular Protestant youth, in an urban political setting that was predominantly Catholic and  Jewish. He worked at The New York Times but was fired for refusing to cross a picket line during a typesetters' strike. A leader in the East River chapter of the Congress of Racial Equality, Kemble helped to organize a non-violent blockade of the Triborough Bridge during rush hour, to raise consciousness among suburbanites of the lives of Harlem residents.

Political career

From the middle 1960s, Kemble was active in the youth section of the Socialist Party of America, the Young People's Socialist League (YPSL). In the Party, Kemble's realignment caucus attained majority of the votes in 1968.  His caucus included  Paul Feldman, editor of the party paper New America and Tom Kahn, chief of the League for Industrial Democracy. Kemble was elected as the National Chairman of the YPSL, thereby becoming an ex officio member of the National Committee of the Socialist Party. Following its July 1968 National Convention the governing National Committee elected Kemble the new National Secretary of the Socialist Party, replacing George Woywod. He was also active in the Congress of Racial Equality.

Kemble was Executive Secretary of the Socialist Party of America from 1968-1970.
Kemble was a founder of Negotiation Now!, a group which called for an end to the bombing of North Vietnam and a negotiated settlement of the Vietnam War. He was opposed to a unilateral withdrawal of U.S. forces from Vietnam. In 1972, Kemble organized a protest of the Coalition for a New Foreign and Military Policy, featuring a picket line of 76 Vietnamese. Kemble's protest infuriated its master of ceremonies, Bruce P. Cameron.

In 1972, Kemble was a founder the Coalition for a Democratic Majority (CDM), an association of centrist Democrats that opposed the "new politics" liberalism  exemplified by Senator George McGovern, who suffered the worst defeat of a Presidential candidate in modern times, despite the widespread dislike of Nixon. Kemble was Executive Director of CDM from 1972–76, at which time he left to become a special assistant and speechwriter for Senator Daniel Patrick Moynihan.  He remained with Moynihan until 1979.

Concerned about the direct and indirect role of the Communist Party USA and of sympathizers of Marxist-Leninist politics in the US Peace Movement and in the National Council of Churches, Kemble helped found the Institute on Religion and Democracy.

From 1981 until 1988 was the President of the Committee for Democracy in Central America (PRODEMCA), which criticized Marxist–Leninists in Central America, especially the Sandinistas in Nicaragua and the FMLN in Central America; PRODEMCA was also referred to as "Friends of the Democratic Center in Central America". Beyond criticizing revolutionaries, Kemble lobbied Congress to support the Christian Democratic President of El Salvador José Napoleón Duarte, during the Salvadoran Civil War; he also argued that Congress should fund the Nicaraguan Contras, then engaged in an armed campaign against the Sandinistas, to pressure the Sandinistas to negotiate a peace treaty with more guarantees for the civic opposition. In his support of Congressional funding of the Contras, Kemble was one of the "Gang of Four" of prominent social-democrats or opponents of the Vietnam War; a second was a former antagonist during the Vietnam War, Bruce Cameron, and the others were Robert S. Leiken and Bernard W. Aronson. The Gang of Four differed from the Reagan Administration on some questions. For example, they supported efforts to transfer control of Contra funding from the CIA and Department of Defense to the Department of State's USAID; they also supported negotiations opposed by Reagan Administration "hard-liners" who wished to defeat the Sandinistas, according to Cameron. Kemble's 1980s Central American politics were unpopular among liberals and democratic socialists in the Democratic Party.

He supported the Bill Clinton's campaign for the Presidency. During the Presidency of Bill Clinton, Kemble served first in 1993 as the Deputy Director and then in 1999 as Acting Director of the U.S. Information Agency. He was also made a special representative of Secretary of State Madeleine K. Albright to the Council for a Community of Democracies initiative.

In 2001, Kemble was appointed to the Board of International Broadcasting by President George W. Bush. He also became the Washington, D.C. representative of Freedom House; in his last years, he was especially involved in supporting peace efforts in the Middle East. He declined several offers of official positions in the Bush administration. However, Secretary of State Colin L. Powell appointed Kemble to be the Chairman of the International Eminent Persons Group on Slavery, Abduction and Forced Servitude in Sudan.

Death and legacy
Kemble died on October 15, 2005, at his home in Washington, D.C. after a year-long battle with brain cancer. He was 64 years old at the time of his death and was survived by his wife, two sisters, and his brother.  Kemble referred to himself as a social democrat throughout his life.

Footnotes

References

External links

 
 

American democracy activists
Members of Social Democrats USA
Executive Secretaries of the Socialist Party of America
New York (state) Democrats
AFL–CIO people
American trade union leaders
Workers' rights activists
Activists for African-American civil rights
American political activists
American social activists
American speechwriters
People from Worcester, Massachusetts
Writers from Lancaster, Pennsylvania
University of Colorado alumni
Deaths from cancer in Washington, D.C.
Deaths from brain cancer in the United States
1941 births
2005 deaths